The Argentine (sometimes referred to as Patagonian) Shelf is part of the South American  continental shelf belonging to the Argentine Sea on the Atlantic seaboard, south of about 35°S. It adjoins the coasts of Uruguay,  Argentina and the Falkland (Malvinas) Islands.
Various authorities quote different dimensions of the shelf, depending on how they define its limits. Quoted statistics cites its area as being from 1.2 to 2.7 million square kilometres and its maximum width as being between 760 and 850 kilometres. The shelf itself can be divided into a 100 km band where the seabed slopes at about  then a wide plain (250 to 450 km wide) where the seabed slopes gently to 200 m isobath.

The Falklands Trough separates the Patagonian Shelf from the Scotia Arc.

References

Continental shelves
Landforms of the Atlantic Ocean
Patagonia
Bodies of water of Argentina
Bodies of water of the Falkland Islands
Temperate South America